USBA may refer to:

 United States Boxing Association, the predecessor of the International Boxing Federation
 United States Bicycle Motocross Association
 Utah Sport Bike Association
 Uniformed Services Benefit Association
 United States Billiard Association, the governing body for all Carom Billiard games in the USA including 3-Cushion Billiards.
 USB-A type USB connector